The first competition weekend of the 2012–13 ISU Speed Skating World Cup was held in the Thialf arena in Heerenveen, Netherlands, from Friday, 16 November, until Sunday, 18 November 2012.

Schedule of events
Schedule of the event:

Medal summary

Men's events

Women's events

Standings
The top ten standings in the contested cups after the weekend. The top five nations in the team pursuit cups.

Men's cups

500 m

1000 m

1500 m

5000/10000 m

Mass start

Team pursuit

Women's cups

500 m

1000 m

1500 m

3000/5000 m

Mass start

Team pursuit

References

1
Isu World Cup, 2012-13, 1
ISU Speed Skating World Cup, 2012-13, World Cup 1